The Federation of Indian Chambers of Commerce & Industry (FICCI) is a non-governmental trade association and advocacy group based in India. Mr.Subhrakant , Managing Director, Indian Metals & Ferro Alloys Ltd has today taken over as FICCI President for 2022-2023, from Mr Sanjiv Mehta at the apex chamber's 95th Annual Convention held in New Delhi.

History 
Established in 1927, on the advice of Mahatma Gandhi by Indian businessman G.D. Birla and Purshottamdas Thakurdas. It is the largest, one of the oldest and the apex business organisation in India. It is a non-government, not-for-profit organisation. FICCI draws its membership from the corporate sector, both private and public, including SMEs and MNCs. The chamber has an indirect membership of over 250,000 companies from various regional chambers of commerce. It is involved in sector-specific business building, business promotion and networking.

Currently, it is headquartered in the national capital New Delhi and has a presence in 12 states in India and 8 countries around the world.

Allied Organisations

Confederation of Indian Food Trade and Industry 
Confederation of Indian Food Trade and Industry (CIFTI) caters to the Indian food Industry. It deals with policies, trade affairs and capacity building. CIFTI provides institutional support and partners with the Government and the Indian private sector in promotion and development of Indian food processing industry. CIFTI was established by FICCI in 1985. It is currently led by Sanjay Khajuria who serves as its president.

Arbitration and Conciliation Tribunal 
FICCI Arbitration and Conciliation Tribunal (FACT) provides arbitration services for settling commercial disputes. FACT was established in 1952 and aims at settling business disputes outside the traditional framework offered by courts of law through arbitration and conciliation, as the case may be.

Alliance for Consumer Care 
FICCI Alliance for Consumer Care (FACC) is a dedicated centre set up by FICCI along with Department of Consumer Affairs (India) to enhance consumer care practices and facilitate stakeholder interaction. It facilitates prompt redressal of consumer grievances, a dialogue between the business and consumers and promotion of responsible business practices.

Ladies Organisation 
FICCI Ladies Organisation was established in 1983 to promote entrepreneurship and professional excellence among women in India.

Aditya Birla CSR Centre for Excellence 
Aditya Birla CSR Centre for Excellence is a joint initiative of FICCI and the Aditya Birla Group. The center aims at development of inclusive and holistic CSR practices. This centre also organises the Businessworld FICCI CSR Award, an annual award aimed at identifying & recognising remarkable CSR initiatives.

Confederation of Micro, Small and Medium Enterprises (CMSME) 
Confederation of Micro, Small and Medium Enterprises is an affiliated body of FICCI. It was established in December 2013. It aims to connect MSMEs with mentors, incubators & accelerators and assist them through capacity building programs & services; deliberate of policy concerns of the sector; and provide regular interface between Industry, Government and regulators. In terms of the scope of work, CMSME is similar to FICCI with the only differentiation being the exclusive focus on Micro, Small and Media enterprises in India.

CASCADE 
FICCI Committee Against Smuggling and Counterfeiting Activities Destroying Economy (CASCADE) was launched on 18 January 2011 and aims to run consumer sensitisation drives on the impact of using smuggled, contraband and counterfeit products across India. The body is also engaged in capacity building of law enforcement agencies and research. It has estimated an annual tax loss to government of India due to smuggling and counterfeits at Rs 26,190 crore.

Technology Commercialisation

DRDO–FICCI Accelerated Technology Assessment and Commercialisation (ATAC) Programme
DRDO and FICCI started the ATAC programme in February 2009 with an objective to create commercial linkages for DRDO technologies for use in civilian products and services. The Explosives Detector Kit developed by DRDO is being commercialised under this initiative. Bio-toilets based upon the bio-digester technology developed by DRDO is another such technology being commercialised under the program. It is projected that DRDO will install 18000 bio-toilets across India in cooperation with various states, Union Territories, FICCI and Ganga Action Plan. Besides, over 10000 bio-digesters are being installed in passenger coaches of the Indian Rail.

Taskforces 

 Aerospace and Air Defence Taskforce; Headed by Air Marshal M. Matheswaran (retd.), Indian Air Force.
 International Migration and Diaspora Taskforce; Headed by Alwyn Didar Singh, former Indian civil servant.
 Land Reforms and Policy Taskforce; Headed by R V Kanoria, Kanoria Chemicals
 Edtech Taskforce; Headed by Divya Gokulnath.

Initiatives

Millennium Alliance
FICCI's Millennium alliance aims at supporting and scaling-up low-cost, innovative solutions. It is a joint initiative of FICCI, Department of Science & Technology, Government of India and the United States Agency for International Development. It was launched during July 2012 as an inclusive platform for social impact funds, venture capitalists, corporate foundations, early investors, and donors to support and scale innovative solutions for base of the pyramid populations in India and around the world.

Invest India
Invest India is a public-private partnership between Government and FICCI. A joint venture between FICCI (51% equity), Department of Industrial Policy & Promotion (India) (34%) and State Governments of India (0.5% equity each), Invest India was given a clearance by the Indian cabinet during September 2009 to set up under Section 25 of the Companies Act, 1956. The initiative aims at speedy implementation of foreign investment projects in India and improving the climate for domestic investments.

Services

ATA Carnet
FICCI is India's sole national issuing & guaranteeing association for ATA Carnets ATA Carnets are used by TV / Film crews, journalists, engineers, musicians and industry for temporary moving equipment across borders. FICCI issues and endorses carnets, guarantees the payment of duties and taxes to customs (both domestic and foreign) authorities

Notable alumni

Uday Shankar (2020–2021) 
Dr Sangita Reddy (2019–2020) 
Krishna Kumar Birla (1974–75)
Hari Shankar Singhania (1979–80)
R. P. Goenka (1986–87)
Chirayu Amin (2000–01)
Rajeev Chandrasekhar (2007–08)
Rajan Mittal (2009–10)
Amit Mitra, noted economist and the current Finance Minister of the Indian state of West Bengal was Secretary General, FICCI during 1994–2011. 
Naina Lal Kidwai is the Past President, FICCI. She is the first Indian woman to graduate from Harvard Business School. and currently is the Group General Manager and Country Head of HSBC India.

See also
 Confederation of Indian Industry
 NASSCOM
 ASSOCHAM

References

External links
 Home page of FICCI
 FICCI Blog
 FICCI Official Video Channel on Veblr.com

1927 establishments in India
Trade associations based in India
Chambers of commerce in India
Ministry of Micro, Small and Medium Enterprises
Non-profit organisations based in India
Organisations based in Delhi
Organizations established in 1927